The 1930 Delaware State Hornets football team represented Delaware State University in the 1930 college football season as an independent. Delaware State compiled a 4–2 record.

Schedule

References

Delaware State
Delaware State Hornets football seasons
Delaware State Hornets football